MOS:PSEUDO or MOS:PSEUD may refer to:
 MOS:PSEUDONYM – 
 MOS:PSEUDOCODE – 
 MOS:PSEUDOHEAD: on not abusing for stylistic reasons the wiki markup semicolons that begin definition lists; part of WP:ACCESSIBILITY
 See also Template:Fake heading, for when headings need to be simulated in discussions and documentation without affecting the page's table of contents.